Joe Tom Strawder (September 21, 1940 – August 24, 2005) was an American former professional basketball player born in Belle Glade, Florida.

A 6'10" center from Bradley University where he played with Levern Tart, Strawder played three seasons (1965–1968) in the National Basketball Association as a member of the Detroit Pistons. He averaged 8.6 and 9.9 rebounds in his career.

Notes

1940 births
2005 deaths
American men's basketball players
Basketball players from Florida
Boston Celtics draft picks
Bradley Braves men's basketball players
Camden Bullets players
Centers (basketball)
Detroit Pistons players
People from Belle Glade, Florida